Slavětín is a municipality and village in Olomouc District in the Olomouc Region of the Czech Republic. It has about 200 inhabitants.

History
The first written mention of Slavětín is from 1260.

References

Villages in Olomouc District